Jason Shah (born 14 December 1987) is a British-Indian actor and fitness model. He has participated in the 10th season of the reality show Bigg Boss as a wildcard entrant, and played Captain Hugh Ross in Jhansi Ki Rani on Colors TV. He also played the role of Sir John Greenwood in Barrister Babu.

Early life and career
Shah was born to a British mother and an American father. His mother remarried an Indian man of Gujarati origin. He attended New York Film Academy and graduated from the University of Memphis. He was featured in the 2007 film Partner, played the groom of Katrina Kaif in the "Dupatta Tera Nau Rang Da" music video, and starred in an ad for Van Heusen. He made his Bollywood debut in the 2016 film Fitoor, which featured Aditya Roy Kapoor and Katrina Kaif in the lead roles.

Shah participated in the Indian reality show Bigg Boss 10 as a wild card entrant. He faced criticism in the news for alleging that his Bollywood career was cut short by Katrina Kaif, telling fellow contestants that it was Kaif's fault that he went unnoticed in Fitoor, stating that his cameo was cut short as a result of Kaif wanting to re-shoot her opening scenes in the movie.  He will next feature in Sabaash Naidu, starring alongside Kamal Haasan.

He currently resides in Mumbai, India.

Filmography
Fitoor (2016)
Bigg Boss 10 as himself/Wild Card Contestant (2016)
Sabaash Naidu as Officer Burt Jackson (2016)
Dev DD as Philip (2017)
Chandrashekhar (TV series) as John Nott-Bower (2018)
Thugs of Hindostan as East India Company Officer (2018)
Jhansi Ki Rani (2019 TV series) as Hugh Rose, 1st Baron Strathnairn (2019)
Barrister Babu as Officer Sir John Greenwood (2020)
State of Siege: 26/11 web series released digitally on ZEE5 Platform (2020)
Dev DD 2 web series was released digitally on ZEE5 Platform (2021)
Swaraj (TV series) as Vasco Da Gama

References

External links 

 

British male models
Indian male models
21st-century Indian male actors
Indian male television actors
1986 births
Living people
Bigg Boss (Hindi TV series) contestants